The Koutloumousiou Monastery or Koutloumousi (Κουτλουμούσι) is an Eastern Orthodox monastery in the monastic state of Mount Athos in Greece. The monastery ranks sixth in the hierarchy of the Athonite monasteries.

The monastery was raised with the help of voivodes Nicolae Alexandru Basarab and Vladislav Vlaicu from Wallachia, while other Wallachian voivodes contributed with substantial financial donations (Mircea cel Bătrân, Laiotă Basarab, Basarab cel Tânăr, Vlad al IV-lea Călugărul, Vlad al VI-lea Înecatul, Vlad al VII-lea Vintilă, Radu cel Mare, Neagoe Basarab).

The monastery's library contains 662 manuscripts and approximately 3,500 printed books.

It has 26 working monks.

 connects Koutloumousiou Monastery with Karyes.

Notable people
George (Schaefer)
St. Paisios of Mount Athos
Father Christodoulos, who became Abbot of Koutloumousiou in 1975 after migrating with 8 monks from a monastery in Euboea

Gallery

References

External links

 Official website
 Koutloumousiou monastery at the Mount Athos website
 Greek Ministry of Culture: Holy Monastery of Koutloumousiou

 
Greek Orthodox monasteries
Monasteries on Mount Athos
Christian monasteries established in the 14th century